Alan Watson Steelman (born March 15, 1942) is an American businessman from Dallas who served as a Republican congressman from Texas between 1973 and 1977; at the time of his election, he was the youngest sitting member of Congress. He gave up his Fifth Congressional District seat to challenge Democratic incumbent Lloyd M. Bentsen, Jr., in the 1976 election.

Steelman was born in Little Rock, Arkansas. He attended Baylor University in Waco, Texas, on a baseball scholarship. He graduated with a Bachelor of Arts in political science in 1964 and was president of his class. He led the Republican Party of Dallas County from 1966-1969, and received an MLA degree in 1971 from Southern Methodist University in Dallas.

Political career

U.S. Representative
In 1972, Steelman was a visiting fellow at the John F. Kennedy Institute of Politics at Harvard University in Cambridge, Massachusetts. From 1969 to 1972, he was a member of President Richard M. Nixon's Advisory Council on Minority Business Enterprise, when he was elected to Congress. Steelman unseated incumbent Democratic Congressman Earle Cabell, a former mayor of Dallas who had served since 1965 and had previously  unseated the Republican incumbent Bruce Alger in 1964. Steelman polled 74,932 votes (55.7 percent) to Cabell's 59,601 (44.3 percent).

His campaign manager was the later Texas Republican state chairman Fred Meyer, a Dallas businessman originally from suburban Chicago. At the date of his election in 1972, Steelman was the youngest Republican member of the House at age 29.

In 1974, a heavily Democratic year both in Texas and nationally, Steelman barely survived the challenge of Mike McKool. In a low-turnout election, Steelman polled 28,446 (52.1 percent) to McKool's 26,190 (47.9 percent).

Time magazine listed Steelman among its "200 Emerging Young National Leaders" in 1974, in a special edition devoted to leadership in America. The defunct Dallas Times Herald, in endorsing his re-election bid that year called him one of "the best ever sent to Congress for Texas." Texas Monthly magazine named him one of the top five most effective members of the then 26-person Texas congressional delegation during only his second term. New Times, a Washington-based national magazine, named him one of the "Ten Best Congressmen" of the 435-member body in 1973.

Steelman served on two committees: Government Operations and Interior and Insular Affairs. He focused on environmental issues, namely the fight against the Trinity River Canal and for Big Thicket National Preserve. Additional priorities included energy, transportation, veterans, wage and price controls, and Social Security.

1976 U.S. Senate campaign
Steelman did not seek a third term in the U.S. House in 1976 but instead opposed the reelection of Senator Lloyd Bentsen. Senate returns gave Bentsen 2,199,956 (56.8 percent) to Steelman's 1,631,370 (42.2 percent). Bentsen not only defeated the 34-year-old Steelman by a comfortable margin of 56.8% to 42.2%. Steelman's U.S. House seat also reverted to the Democrats in 1976, with the winner being future Texas Attorney General James Albon "Jim" Mattox, who defeated the Republican Nancy Judy.

Personal life
Steelman never again sought office after the loss to Bentsen. In 1977, he began work with Alexander Proudfoot, a listed company on the London Stock Exchange, and is Vice Chairman. He has served as Group President for the Asia-Pacific region of Proudfoot and lived in Singapore for eight years to build the start-up there. In 1978, he was elected to the Common Cause National Governing Board. He was appointed by Governor George W. Bush to the Texas Growth Fund Board, a $600 million venture capital fund run by the State of Texas. He has also served as Vice Chairman of the Board at the John Tower Center for Political Studies at SMU and the Trinity Foundation, Chairman of the Dallas Council on World Affairs, and former President of Maxager Technology, Inc. (Profit Velocity Solutions).

In August 2020, Steelman endorsed Joe Biden for president. He was a member of the steering committee of Republicans and Independents for Biden.

Following the 2021 storming of the United States Capitol, Steelman signed a letter supporting the impeachment of Donald Trump.

Steelman resides in Dallas and is married to Susan Seligman Fuller Steelman. He is the father of five children and the stepfather of two. He is an avid golfer and reads history and biography.

References

Official Website
Congressional Quarterly's Guide to U.S. Elections, House and Senate

1942 births
Living people
Baylor University alumni
Southern Methodist University alumni
People from Dallas
Politicians from Little Rock, Arkansas
Candidates in the 1976 United States elections
20th-century American politicians
Republican Party members of the United States House of Representatives from Texas